Wiking Helikopter Service GmbH is a German helicopter operator, specialising in providing offshore helicopter transportation in the North Sea and Baltic Sea, Germany and UK.

Overview 
Wiking is specialised in offshore winching of passengers to vessels and wind turbines. Since the start in 1975, Wiking is providing its services to the maritime pilots "Lotsenbrüderschaft Weser and Jade" in the German Bight. Wiking Helikopter Service also is an Airbus Helicopters and Leonardo Helicopters Customer Support Center and provides maintenance services on the Leonardo AW139 and Airbus Helicopters H145 helicopters in Europe.

In October 2022, Wiking filed bankruptcy and a part is taken over by the German operator Northern Helicopter NHC. From 31 December 2022, Wiking will no longer exist.

Fleet 
As of June 2022, WIKING Helikopter Service operates the following helicopters:

3 Leonardo AW139
4 Airbus Helicopters H145

References

External links 
 

Helicopter airlines
Airlines of Germany
Companies based in Bremen